Tom Talbot (1936–2009) was an American painter. His work can be seen at the Museum of Nebraska Art.

References

1936 births
2009 deaths
People from Broken Bow, Nebraska
Painters from Nebraska
American male painters
20th-century American painters
20th-century American male artists